Phyllosticta cucurbitacearum, commonly called "Phyllosticta leaf spot", is a fungal plant pathogen affecting cucurbits.

References

External links
 USDA ARS Fungal Database
 Catalog of Life

Fungal plant pathogens and diseases
Vegetable diseases
cucurbitacearum
Fungi described in 1878